Cirkus Humberto was a Czechoslovak television programme which was first broadcast in 1988. The programme was directed by František Filip.

Cast

 Jaromír Hanzlík
 Petr Haničinec
 Kathy Kriegel
 Josef Kemr
 Martin Růžek
 Jiřina Bohdalová
 Radoslav Brzobohatý
 Claudine Coster
 Josef Dvořák
 Jiří Bartoška
 Petr Nárožný
 Iva Janžurová
 Katja Rupé
 Werner Possardt
 Václav Postránecký
 Oldřich Vízner
 Kateřina Macháčková
 Lubomír Lipský
 Josef Somr
 Jiří Lábus
 Radovan Lukavský
 Josef Laufer
 Jiří Holý
 Vladimír Krška
 Pavel Mang
 Martina Hudečková
 Pavel Vondruška
 Jana Janatová
 Karolína Kubalová
 Adolf Filip
 František Němec
 Jana Paulová
 Wolfgang Bathke
 Hana Brejchová
 Jana Hlaváčová
 Josef Abrhám
 Patrick Préjean
 Libuše Šafránková
 Dagmar Havlová
 Jaroslava Adamová
 Svatopluk Beneš
 Vlastimil Drbal
 Hana Gregorová
 Miloslav Homola
 Václav Kotva
 Taťjana Medvecká
 Josef Větrovec
 Jana Šulcová
 Stanislav Fišer
 Jiří Lír
 Viktor Preiss
 Martin Stropnický
 Robert Vrchota
 Petr Skarke
 Igor Smržík
 Rudolf Vodrážka
 Antonín Jedlička
 Rudolf Hrušínský jr.
 Marek Pavlovský
 Tereza Vokurková
 Josef Kubíček
 Oldřich Velen
 Jana Boušková
 Vladimír Pospíšil
 Hugo Kaminský
 Hanuš Bor
 Karel Chromík
 Otakar Brousek Sr.
 František Hanus
 Klára Lidová
 Barbora Kohoutková
 Kurt Conradi
 Dietrich Adam
 Jörg von Liebenfelß
 Radovan Lukavský	(voice)
 Pavla Mixtajová
 Lumír Banat
 Hussain Ibrahim Hussain
 Amarnath Chatterjee
 Jiří Bubeníček
 Otto Bubeníček
 D. Halušková
 R. Hadrovský
 Daniel Štipka
 Št. Hlinovská

References

External links 
 CSFD.cz - Cirkus Humberto (TV seriál)
 

Czechoslovak television series
1988 Czechoslovak television series debuts
Czech drama television series
1980s Czechoslovak television series
Czechoslovak Television original programming